Băla (Hungarian: Bala) is a commune in Mureș County, Transylvania, Romania. It is composed of two villages, Băla and Ercea (Nagyercse; Groß-Ertschen).

See also
List of Hungarian exonyms (Mureș County)

References

Communes in Mureș County
Localities in Transylvania